Peter Hollins (1 May 1800 – 16 August 1886) was an English sculptor operating throughout the 19th century.

Life
He was born on 1 May 1800 at 17 Great Hampton Street, Birmingham, the fourth child and eldest son of the sculptor and architect William Hollins and his wife Catherine. Several members of his family were involved in artistic pursuits, including a cousin, John Hollins, the son of a Birmingham glass painter, who found success as a painter of portraits and historical subjects in London.

Hollins studied drawing under Vincent Barber and sculpture in his father's studio before moving to London in 1822 to work for Francis Chantrey. He assisted Chantrey with the installation of his portrait of James Watt in the Watt Memorial Chapel at St Mary’s Church in Handsworth. In London, Hollins shared a studio with fellow Birmingham artist, Henry Room, in Old Bond Street where he held an exhibition of his work in 1831. It included a group entitled, Conrad and Medora illustrating a scene from "The Corsair" by Lord Byron. It won the Sir Robert Lawley Award at the Birmingham Society of Arts, reconfirming Hollins’ close links with his native city. He visited Italy around 1835 and returned to Birmingham in 1843 to take over his father's studio on Great Hampton Street in the Jewellery Quarter. In 1839 he competed, unsuccessfully, for the Lord Nelson Memorial commission for Trafalgar Square, won by Edward Hodges Baily.

Showing both classical and romantic influences, he produced over sixty major works, including statuary at Malvern Priory, Bodelwyddan Castle, the Royal College of Surgeons and Weston Park. He also sculpted the public statues of Sir Robert Peel in Birmingham and Dr Jephson in Jephson Gardens, Leamington Spa.

Although he was less well known as a result of being based outside London for much of his career, Hollins' best work is considered to be the equal of that of Chantrey. His cousin, John Hollins, moved to London to paint portraits and became an associate of the Royal Academy.

Hollins was vice-President of the Royal Birmingham Society of Artists for 37 years, and also exhibited at the Royal Academy. He taught modelling for the Birmingham Society of Artists and was instrumental in securing the Royal Charter for the Society in 1868. Sadly, he felt as though the town of Birmingham had been slow to exploit his talents as a sculptor. He said: ‘I wish to draw a veil over my labours for my native town as they were a grievous disappointment to me, and the more than Egyptian darkness and ignorance of that branch of art which I had chosen was simply appalling'.

Hollins ceased stone sculpture (which requires great upper body strength) in later in life, due to his suffering from rheumatism, which was perhaps caused by prolonged working with wet clay in a cold studio. He died in the house of his birth on 16 August 1886.

Main Works
see
Statue of Henry Paget, 1st Marquess of Anglesey (1825) exhibited at the Royal Academy
Bust of Edward Grainger (1825) for the Royal College of Surgeons in London
Bust of Charles Lloyd (1831) for Birmingham General Hospital
Bust of Felix Mendelssohn (1850) for Birmingham Town Hall
Bust of William Congreve Russell (1853) exhibited at Birmingham Society of Arts
Statue of Robert Peel (1855) in Calthorpe Park in Birmingham
Statue of Thomas Attwood (1859) in Calthorpe Park in Birmingham
Statue of Rowland Hill (1868) originally in Birmingham Exchange, moved to Birmingham GPO in 1874 and to GPO headquarters in 1891 (lost following storage in WW2)

Funerary Monuments

Sir Henry Wakeman (1831, including bust) in Claines Church in Worcester.
Ornate surround to stained glass window (c.1845 including bust) to his father William Hollins in St Paul's Church, Birmingham
Memorial to the Officers and Men of the 80th Regiment of Foot (Staffordshire Volunteers) (1850) in Lichfield Cathedral
John Hollins (1855) his cousin, buried in Kensal Green Cemetery
John Badley (1870) in St Edmund's Church in Dudley

References

1800 births
1886 deaths
English sculptors
English male sculptors
People from Birmingham, West Midlands
Members and Associates of the Royal Birmingham Society of Artists
19th-century British sculptors